Koi magazine is a British guide to the Koi keeping hobby.

History
Koi magazine was launched by Origin Publishing in February 1999 as Koi, Ponds and Gardens and is published 13 times a year. The title changed to Koi in September 2004 to reflect its focus on Koi keeping. It is also the official magazine of the British Koi Keepers Society.

External links
Koi magazine website

1999 establishments in the United Kingdom
Animal and pet magazines
Hobby magazines published in the United Kingdom
Fishkeeping
Magazines established in 1999